Polarity may refer to:

Science
Electrical polarity, direction of electrical current
Polarity (mutual inductance), the relationship between components such as transformer windings
Polarity (projective geometry), in mathematics, a duality of order two
Polarity in embryogenesis, the animal and vegetal poles within a blastula
Cell polarity, differences in the shape, structure, and function of cells
Chemical polarity, in chemistry, a separation of electric charge
Magnetic polarity, north or south poles of a magnet
Polar reciprocation, a concept in geometry also known as polarity
Trilinear polarity, a concept in geometry of the triangle
Polarity of a literal, in mathematical logic

Humanities
Polarity (international relations), a description of the distribution of power within the international system
Polarity of gender, when a word takes the opposite grammatical gender than expected
Polarity item, in linguistics, the sensitiveness of some expression to negative or affirmative contexts
Affirmation and negation, also known as grammatical polarity
Sexual polarity, a concept of dualism between masculine and feminine

Other uses
Polarity (game), a board game
Polarity (Decrepit Birth album), 2010
Polarity (Norman album), 2003
Polarity (The Wedding album), 2007

See also 
Polar (disambiguation)
Polarization (disambiguation)
Pole (disambiguation)
Dualism (disambiguation)
Symmetric bilinear form § Orthogonal polarities